Catherine Pujol (born 6 April 1960) is a French politician from National Rally who represented Pyrénées-Orientales's 2nd constituency in the National Assembly from 2020 to 2022.

Political career 
At the 2017 French legislative election, Pujol was the substitute candidate for Louis Aliot in Pyrénées-Orientales's 2nd constituency. Pujol became a member of the National Assembly following Aliot's election as mayor of Perpignan due to the dual mandate.

She did not seek re-election in the 2022 French legislative election.

References

External links 
 Biography at the French Parliament

Living people
1960 births
21st-century French women politicians
People from Perpignan
People from Pyrénées-Orientales
Politicians from Occitania (administrative region)
National Rally (France) politicians
Deputies of the 15th National Assembly of the French Fifth Republic
Members of Parliament for Pyrénées-Orientales